The 66th Golden Globe Awards, honoring the best in film and television of 2008, was broadcast on January 11, 2009, from the Beverly Hilton Hotel in Beverly Hills, California, United States on the NBC TV network. The broadcast was watched by approximately 14.6 million viewers with a rating of 4.9/12. The ceremony returned after the previous year's ceremony was canceled due to the Writers Guild of America strike. The nominations were announced on December 12, 2008.

Winners and nominees

These are the nominees for the 66th Golden Globe Awards. Winners are listed at the top of each list.

Film

Television

Awards breakdown
The following films and programs received multiple nominations:

Films

Television 

The following films and programs received multiple wins:

Film

Television

Ceremony

Presenters 

 Simon Baker
 Elizabeth Banks
 Sacha Baron Cohen
 Drew Barrymore
 Tom Brokaw
 Pierce Brosnan
 Sandra Bullock
 Gerard Butler
 Don Cheadle
 Glenn Close
 Sean Combs
 Tom Cruise
 Patrick Dempsey
 Johnny Depp
 Cameron Diaz
 David Duchovny
 Aaron Eckhart
 Zac Efron
 Colin Farrell
 Laurence Fishburne
 Megan Fox
 Ricky Gervais
 Jake Gyllenhaal
 Maggie Gyllenhaal
 Salma Hayek
 Dustin Hoffman
 Terrence Howard
 The Jonas Brothers
 Shah Rukh Khan
 Jane Krakowski
 Jessica Lange
 Blake Lively
 Eva Longoria
 Jennifer Lopez
 Eva Mendes
 Demi Moore
 Hayden Panettiere
 Chris Pine
 Freida Pinto
 Amy Poehler
 Zachary Quinto
 Seth Rogen
 Susan Sarandon
 Martin Scorsese
 Sting
 Emma Thompson
 Mark Wahlberg
 Sigourney Weaver
 Rainn Wilson
 Renee Zellweger

Cecil B. DeMille Award 
Steven Spielberg

Miss Golden Globe 
Rumer Willis (daughter of Bruce Willis & Demi Moore)

Note: Heath Ledger's award was accepted on his behalf by director of The Dark Knight, Chris Nolan.

See also
 Hollywood Foreign Press Association
 81st Academy Awards
 61st Primetime Emmy Awards
 60th Primetime Emmy Awards
 15th Screen Actors Guild Awards
 62nd British Academy Film Awards
 29th Golden Raspberry Awards
 63rd Tony Awards
 2008 in film
 2008 in American television

References

External links

066
2008 film awards
2008 television awards
2008 awards in the United States
January 2009 events in the United States